Sara Opal Piontkowski Heron Search (14 July 1890 - 3 September 1961) was an American composer who wrote chamber music as well as works for orchestra, concert band, and voice under the name Sara Opal Search.

Search was born in Fort Worth, Texas. Her mother was Countess Dolly von Piontkowski. Little is known about her education. She married Herbert Heron in 1905 or 1906, and they had two children, Billie and Constance. In 1923, she divorced Heron and married cellist and composer Frederick Preston Search, who was an orchestra leader at the Hotel del Monte in Carmel, California, at the time.

Search’s first composition, Symphony in c minor, was copyrighted in 1941. In a letter to Howes Norris Jr., who had requested her autograph, she noted that. . .  "my Symphony in c minor is my first composition; Mr. Wallenstine [probably Alfred Wellenstein] is the first conductor to read it and conduct it; and you are the first person to ask me for my autograph!"

Search’s works are archived at the University of California, Berkeley’s Hargrove Music Library. Her compositions include:

Band 

Barcarolle
Serenade (trombone and concert band)
Waltz

Chamber 

Allegro Giocoso (flute solo)
Quintet (woodwind quintet)
Scherzo (string quartet)
Solo for Cello
Solo for Trumpet
String Quartet in e flat minor
String Quartet No. 2

Orchestra 

Allegro Giocoso (flute and orchestra)
Allegro Moderato (violin or cello and orchestra)
Suite for Symphony Orchestra
Symphony in c minor (string orchestra)
Symphony No. 2

Piano 

Go to Sleep
Little Darling Waltz
Nocturnes No. 1 and 2
Pastoral
Prelude
Serenade
Siesta
Waltz
Waltzing in the Park

Vocal 

“Dirge” (voice and piano)
“I’m So Blue” (voice and piano)
“Kathleen” (voice and piano)
“Linda” (voice and piano)
Remember, My Darling (voice, brass, and strings)
“Song for Susie/Kitty Song” (voice and piano)

References 

American women composers
String quartet composers
1890 births
1961 deaths
People from Fort Worth, Texas